Judo is one of the sports at the quadrennial Commonwealth Games competition. It was first competed as a demonstration sport at the 1986 Games before being included in the main program for the first time in 1990. Starting with the 2022 Games, Judo is a core sport that is required to be part of the sporting program of each edition of the Games,  having previously been an optional sport.

Editions

All-time medal table

Updated after the 2022 Commonwealth Games.

References

External links
 Commonwealth Games sport index

 
Sports at the Commonwealth Games
Commonwealth Games